The 1985 Speedway World Team Cup was the 26th edition of the FIM Speedway World Team Cup to determine the team world champions.

The final took place at the Veterans Memorial Stadium (Long Beach), in California, United States. Denmark won their third consecutive title (and fifth in total) surpassing Poland's four titles and moving into third place in the all time list.

Qualification

Round 1

 May 12, 1985
  Bradford
 Att: 8,000
 Ref: J M Price (GB) 	 	

* 1st & 2nd to Intercontinental Final

Round 2

 May 12, 1985
  Skien

* 1st & 2nd to Intercontinental Final

Round 3

 May 12, 1985
  Civitanova Marche

* 1st & 2nd to Continental Semi-Final

Round 4

 May 12, 1985
  Olching
 Att: 6,000

* 1st & 2nd to Continental Semi-Final

Tournament

Continental Semifinal

 May 22, 1985
  Gorzów
 Att: 18,000

* 1st & 2nd to Continental Final

Intercontinental Final

 June 22, 1985
  Vojens
 Att: 12,000
 Ref: Mel Price

* Winner to Final ; 2nd & 3rd to Continental Final

Continental Final

 July 7, 1985
  Neustadt
 Att: 8,000

* 1st & 2nd to Final

World Final

 August 10, 1985
  Long Beach, Veterans Memorial Stadium
 Att: 18,000

See also
 1985 Individual Speedway World Championship
 1985 Speedway World Pairs Championship

References

Speedway World Team Cup
1985 in speedway